Sweden is a Scandinavian country in Northern Europe and the third-largest country in the European Union by area. It is also a member of the United Nations, the Nordic Council, Council of Europe, the World Trade Organization and the Organisation for Economic Co-operation and Development (OECD). Sweden maintains a Nordic social welfare system that provides universal health care and tertiary education for its citizens. It has the world's eighth-highest per capita income and ranks highly in numerous metrics of national performance, including quality of life, health, education, protection of civil liberties, economic competitiveness, equality, prosperity and human development.

For further information on the types of business entities in this country and their abbreviations, see "Business entities in Sweden".

Largest firms 

This list shows firms in the Fortune Global 500, which ranks firms by total revenues reported before March 31, 2017. Only the top five firms (if available) are included as a sample.

Notable firms 
This list includes notable companies with primary headquarters located in the country. The industry and sector follow the Industry Classification Benchmark taxonomy. Organizations which have ceased operations are included and noted as defunct.

See also

 Confederation of Swedish Enterprise
 Economy of Sweden
 List of banks in Sweden
 List of Swedish entrepreneurs
 List of Swedish government enterprises
 List of Swedish people by net worth
 List of video game companies of Sweden

References

External links 
 Flexiwaggon
 Tikab-Strukturmekanik-AB

 
Sweden
 Companies